Berezovka is a rural locality (a selo) and the administrative center of Rassvetovskoye Rural Settlement, Yelansky District, Volgograd Oblast, Russia. The population was 1,003 as of 2010. There are 8 streets.

Geography 
The village is located on the bank of the Tersa River.

References 

Rural localities in Yelansky District